The Statute of Westminster 1472 was an Act of Edward IV of England requiring a tax of four bow staves per tun of cargo to be provided by each ship arriving at an English Port.

In 1470 an edict had been passed requiring compulsory training in the use of the longbow.  This resulted in a shortage of yew wood. The statute sought to overcome this shortage.

References

Acts of the Parliament of England
1470s in law
1472 in England